"Backseat of a Greyhound Bus" is a song written by Chris Lindsey, Hillary Lindsey, Aimee Mayo and Troy Verges and recorded by the American country music artist Sara Evans in February 2003 as the first single from her 2003 album, Restless. The song became Evans' sixth Top 20 hit on the US Billboard Hot Country Songs chart with a peak at number 16.

Content
"Backseat of a Greyhound Bus" is about an unwed mother escaping her hometown in the American South in a Greyhound bus and giving birth while on the bus on Interstate 40 in Tennessee “somewhere between Jackson and Memphis".

Critical reception
Deborah Evans Price of Billboard gave the song a positive review, saying that "Sara's sweet, ethereal vocals bring the story vividly to life." She also praised the song's production.

Chart performance
"Backseat of a Greyhound Bus" debuted at number 56 on the U.S. Billboard Hot Country Singles & Tracks for the week of March 1, 2003.

Year-end charts

References

Songs about buses
2003 singles
Sara Evans songs
Songs written by Aimee Mayo
Songs written by Hillary Lindsey
Songs written by Chris Lindsey
Songs written by Troy Verges
Country ballads
Song recordings produced by Paul Worley
RCA Records Nashville singles
2003 songs